Hopewell is an unincorporated community in Marion County, West Virginia, United States. It lies at an elevation of 1050 feet (320 m).

References

Unincorporated communities in Marion County, West Virginia
Unincorporated communities in West Virginia